Takmilat Fath al-Mulhim is arguably the most important work of Muhammad Taqi Usmani in Arabic, in which he completed in six volumes the commentary of Shabbir Ahmad Usmani on Sahih Muslim. Muhammad Zahid Al-Kawthari regarded Allama Shabbir Usmani's incomplete commentary as the best commentary on Sahih Muslim. Many scholars, including Sayyid Abu'l Hasan Ali Nadwi, have affirmed that Usmani's Takmila is even better. Shaykh Faraz Rabbani mentions that this work is one of the most important hadith commentaries, especially because of its extensive explanation of numerous modern and contemporary issues with great mastery and authority while commenting upon the hadith of Muhammad.

See also
Muhammad Taqi Usmani bibliography
Deobandi hadith studies

Reference

Sahih Muslim
Deobandi hadith literature
Books by Muhammad Taqi Usmani
Hadith commentaries